Alphonse Bouton (15 April 1908 – 27 April 1989) was a French rower. He competed at the 1936 Summer Olympics in Berlin with the men's eight where they were eliminated in the semi-final.

References

1908 births
1989 deaths
French male rowers
Olympic rowers of France
Rowers at the 1936 Summer Olympics
Rowers at the 1948 Summer Olympics
European Rowing Championships medalists